The Menger Cat 17 is an American trailerable sailboat that was designed by Andrew Menger as a daysailer and cruiser and first built in 1983.

The boat was based on the lines of a 1905 William Goeller catboat design.

Production
The design was built by Menger Boatworks in Babylon, New York, United States from 1983 until 1990, but it is now out of production.

After the molds for the Menger Cat 17 design were destroyed in 1990 by a fire started by lightning, the design was replaced in the company product line by the Menger Cat 19.

Design
The Menger Cat 17 is a recreational keelboat, built predominantly of fiberglass, with wood trim. It has a catboat rig, a plumb stem, a plumb transom, a transom-hung rudder controlled by a tiller and a fixed stub keel and retractable centerboard. It displaces  and carries  of ballast.

The boat is normally fitted with a small  outboard motor for docking and maneuvering. An inboard diesel engine as a factory option. The inboard model has a fuel tank that holds .

The design has sleeping accommodation for two people, with a double "V"-berth in the bow cabin around a drop-leaf table, with the two leaves mounted to the centerboard trunk. The galley is located on the starboard side just forward of the companionway and slides aft for stowage, when not in use. The galley is equipped with a single-burner stove and a sink. A portable ice box may be stowed under the cockpit on the starboard side. The head is a portable type and is stowed aft, under the cockpit, on the port side. There are cockpit lockers to both port and starboard.

Operational history
In a 2010 review Steve Henkel wrote, "this design ... is an easily trailerable, readily cruisable boat loaded with character. Best features: She responds to her helm nicely in all but the strongest (25-30 knots) gusts. The cabin arrangement is outstanding, made possible by moving the lower portion of the companionway bulkhead aft, That means a portable ice chest, portable head, even a galley unit can be slid out of the way under the cockpit, The cabin finish also wins high marks for its neat white fiberglass cabin liner, varnished pine wainscoting on cabin sides, teak and holly sole, and maple drop-leaf table hinged off the centerboard trunk. The cabin arrangement permits extra-long berths: the starboard berth measures 7' 10" end to end; the port berth extends 10' 6". Worst features: The fiberglass gaff saddle on some boats is unlined and may tend to scrape away the mast paint. Also, the outboard gas tank is kept in the port cockpit locker, so that although the open shelf where it sits is vented to the cockpit, gasoline fumes still might find their way into the bilge, a potentially dangerous situation."

See also
List of sailing boat types

References

Keelboats
1980s sailboat type designs
Sailing yachts
Trailer sailers
Sailboat type designs by Andrew Menger
Sailboat types built by Menger Boatworks